Alexandro Bernabei (born 24 September 2000) is an Argentine professional footballer who plays as a left-back for Scottish Premiership club Celtic. He previously played for Lanús.

Club career

Lanús
Bernabei came through the youth ranks of Lanús, with manager Luis Zubeldía promoting the defender into his first-team squad during the 2019–20 campaign. Bernabei's senior bow arrived on 19 October 2019, as he was selected to start a Primera División fixture with Talleres. He scored six minutes into his debut, prior to being substituted in the second half for Nicolás Orsini in an eventual 4–2 win at the Estadio Mario Alberto Kempes. In his thirtieth career appearance on 13 January 2021, Bernabei scored in a Copa Sudamericana semi-final second leg victory at home to Vélez Sarsfield.

Celtic
Scottish Premiership club Celtic signed Bernabei in June 2022 for a fee of around £3.75 million. He made his competitive debut for the club on 28 August 2022 as a late substitute in a 9-0 win against Dundee United at Tannadice Park in the Scottish Premiership.

On 11 October 2022, Bernabei came on as an 80th minute substitute to make his UEFA Champions League debut in a 0-2 loss against RB Leipzig at Celtic Park.

International career
Bernabei represented Argentina's U19s at the 2018 South American Games in Bolivia.

Career statistics

Notes

References

External links

2000 births
Living people
Argentine footballers
Club Atlético Lanús footballers
Celtic F.C. players
Argentine expatriate footballers
Argentine Primera División players
Sportspeople from Santa Fe Province
Expatriate footballers in Scotland
Argentine expatriate sportspeople in Scotland
People from Iriondo Department
Argentine people of Italian descent
Argentina youth international footballers
Association football defenders
Scottish Professional Football League players